"Ditmas" is a song by the band Mumford & Sons from their third studio album Wilder Mind. It was released worldwide as the third single from the album on September 11, 2015, and was sent to American alternative stations on 17 November 2015.

Background
The title of the song stems from Ditmas Park, Brooklyn, in New York City; Ditmas Park is the location of The National guitarist Aaron Dessner's studio where most of the album was written and demoed. The song is a representation of the change in the band's sound, most noticeably less usage of the banjo and more utilization of electric instruments. The song is described as a breakup song.

Music video
The music video for the song showcases the relationship between a Ukrainian Cossack and his horse. Directed by Alex Southam, the video was shot in Kyiv, Ukraine. The band is also seen performing the song throughout the video.

Charts

References

Mumford & Sons songs
Songs written by Ben Lovett (British musician)
Songs written by Ted Dwane
Songs written by Winston Marshall
2015 songs
2015 singles
Music videos shot in Ukraine
Songs written by Marcus Mumford